Foro (English: "Forum"), is a broadcast news television channel owned by TelevisaUnivision. It is seen on most Mexican cable systems and full-time on two stations in Mexico, including XHTV-TDT in Mexico City, with selected programs airing on Televisa Regional and Televisa local stations. Foro is available on most Mexican cable and fiber-optic systems and the SKY Mexico satellite service, as well as on several national cable systems in the United States.

History
FOROtv launched on cable and satellite on February 15, 2010, and marked Televisa's return to the cable news business after operating the Noticias ECO service between 1988 and 2001. On August 30 of that year, it made its broadcast television debut when XHTV ditched its programming lineup aimed at Mexico City to carry FOROtv's programs.

On March 28, 2022, the channel was rebranded to simply Foro, and is now classed as an extension of TelevisaUnivision's "N+" banner of news programming.

Current programs

Some of the programs on Foro currently include the following:
Las Noticias con Erik Camacho (The News with Erik Camacho, 5am morning newscast)
 Expresso de la mañana (Morning Express, hosted by Esteban Arce)
Paralelo 23 (23rd Parallel, hosted by Ana Lucía Ordoñana)
Noticias MX (News MX, anchored by Enrique Campos)
A las Tres (At 3:00, anchored by Ana Paula Ordorica)
Fractal (Factual, anchored by Ana Francisca Vega)
Agenda Pública (Public Agenda with Mario Campos)
En la mira (In an Hour with Eduardo Salazar) 
Hora 21 (The 21st Hour, anchored by Julio Patan)
Es La Hora De Opinar (It's Time to Discuss with Leo Zuckermann)
Oppenheimer Presenta (Oppenheimer Presents with Andres Oppenheimer)

Sports
Foro carries some sports coverage which is overlaid with documentary and news review programming outside Mexico. This includes coverage of Formula 1, MLB, NHL, NBA, Sunday afternoon NFL games, and NASCAR.

Stations

Full-time
Foro programming is carried full-time on Mexico City's XHTV-TDT.

In January 2018, Televisa was approved to put FOROtv as a digital subchannel of six of its regional stations, primarily in northern Mexico. Another 18 stations (Guadalajara, Monterrey, San Luis Potosí, Morelia and Puebla, followed by Aguascalientes, Chihuahua, Cuernavaca, León, Torreón, Toluca and Durango, then Acapulco, Coatzacoalcos, Culiacán, Mérida, Oaxaca, Querétaro, Saltillo and Xalapa) were added in early 2018.

Part-time
Foro's lack of full-time stations, however, was traditionally supplemented by its use by Televisa's local partners and most Televisa Regional stations. Most of these stations only took selected newscasts in key dayparts. With Televisa shedding many of its local affiliate partners, these relationships have come to an end.

The American version of the network departs from the main Foro schedule in late night to air domestically originated paid programming. This received voluminous criticism from American viewers, especially during breaking news situations when it overlays overnight breaking news coverage (in the past, paid programming also aired during the daytime, but this has since been discontinued). There are occasionally some technical issues during network programming, as Televisa-Univision must air other content over the Mexican ad breaks, usually with looping promotional advertisements for Foro itself or select advertising originating from the US, such as medical advertising aimed at Spanish-speaking senior citizens.

Repeaters
The following stations, all but two Las Estrellas repeaters, carry Foro. As mentioned above, the network's flagship is XHTV-TDT in Mexico City, and in Ciudad Juárez, it is carried on the second subchannel of the Televisa local station, as that city's Las Estrellas repeater carries a secondary feed for viewers and pay-TV providers in El Paso, Texas with American-centric advertising and blackouts of programming claimed by American-side stations.

|-

|-

|-

|-

|-

|-

|-

|-

|-

|-

|-

|-

|-

|-

|-

|-

|-

|-

|-

|-

|-

|-

|-

|-

|-

|-

|-

|-

|-

|-

|-

|-

|-

|-

|-

|-

See also
Noticieros Televisa

References

External links
Foro 

Television channels and stations established in 2010
24-hour television news channels in Mexico
Televisa broadcast television networks